Fred Webster may refer to:

Fred Webster (Australian footballer) (1935–2012), played for Melbourne and Sandringham
Fred Webster (boxer) (1908–1971), British boxer
Fred Webster (English footballer) (1887–?), English footballer
Fred Webster (rugby league) (1882–?), England and Great Britain international
Frederick Webster (1885–1938), English cricketer
Fred Webster (cricketer, born 1897) (1897–1931), English cricketer